Androcide is the systematic killing of men, boys, or males in general. Worldwide, males constitute 79% of non-conflict homicides and the majority of direct conflict deaths.

Lexicology
Androcide is a coordinate term of femicide and a hyponym of gendercide. The etymological root of the hybrid word is derived from a combination of the Greek prefix andro meaning "man" or boy, with the Latin suffix cide, meaning killing.

People
In the proactive scenario of human societies, androcide may be a deliberate goal, perhaps to degrade the offensive capabilities of an adversary. In a more passive scenario, androcide has been likened to misandry when society in general participate in or permit the effective passing of a death sentence on a significant proportion of men and boys, as a result of conscription for military service. An androcidal animosity towards males may be due to rivalry, a perception of a challenge to their dominance or a combination of the two. Some organizations that are critical of feminism as well as some publishers have argued that the targeting of men is a contemporary issue in war. Androcide has also been a feature of literature in ancient Greek mythology and in hypothetical situations wherein there is discord between the sexes.

Warfare
Generally, military services will forcibly conscript men to fight in warfare, inevitably leading to massive male casualties when faced with males on the opposing side. Non-combatant males make up a majority of the casualties in mass killings in warfare. Gendercide Watch, an independent human rights group, documents multiple gendercides which were committed against males: the Anfal campaign (Iraqi Kurdistan), 1988—Armenian genocide, 1915–17—Rwanda, 1994. This practice occurs since soldiers see opposing men, fighting or otherwise, as rivals and a threat to their superiority. Alternatively, they are afraid that these men will attempt to fight back and kill them for any number of reasons, including self defense. In the year 1211, Genghis Khan had planned on the widescale killing of males in retaliation for the revolt against his daughter Alakhai Bekhi, until she persuaded him to only punish the murderers of her husband, the event which caused the revolt.

Plants
With regards to plants, androcide may refer to efforts to direct pollination through emasculating certain crops.

Anfal genocide
The Anfal genocide was a genocide that killed between 50,000 to 182,000 Kurds and thousands of Assyrians at the final stages of the Iran-Iraq War. This act committed during the Anfal Campaign was led by Ali Hassan al-Majid, under the orders of President Saddam Hussein. Anfal, which officially began in 1988, had eight stages in six geographical areas. Every stage followed the same patterns, steer civilians to points near the main road, where they were met by the jash forces and transported to temporary meeting points where they were then separated into three groups: teenage boys and men, women and children, and the elderly. The men and teenage boys were never to be seen again. While women, all children, and the elderly of both genders were sent to camps, men were immediately stripped out of their clothes, only wearing a sharwal, and were executed. Many Kurd men and boys were killed in order to reduce the chance of ever fighting back. Men kill other men in order to stabilize their domains and ward off attacks.

See also
 Genocide
 Srebrenica massacre
 Male expendability
 Violence against men
 Misandry

References

Killings by type
Homicide
Violence against men
Massacres of men